Winding around the inferior cerebellar peduncle in the lower part of the fourth ventricle, and crossing the area acustica and the medial eminence are a number of white strands, the medullary striae, which form a portion of the cochlear division of the vestibulocochlear nerve and disappear into the median sulcus.: stria medullaris are axons of arcuate neurons. Courses in the floor of the fourth ventricle. Joins the restiform body to reach the cerebellum.

Additional images

References

External links
 Diagram at UMich

Vestibulocochlear nerve
Auditory system